Three notable events occurred in 1888 in Russia, under Alexander III.

Events
 Borki train disaster

First editions
Pochtovo-Telegrafnyi Zhurnal
Semya i Shkola

References

1888 in Russia
Years of the 19th century in the Russian Empire